The Hoogovens Wijk aan Zee Steel Chess Tournament 1994 was the 56th edition of the Hoogovens Wijk aan Zee Chess Tournament. It was held in Wijk aan Zee in January 1994 and was won by Predrag Nikolić.

The tournament reverted to its traditional round-robin format, after switching to knockout matches for the first time in 1993, although there were only ten players competing in the A-section.

{| class="wikitable" style="text-align: center;"
|+ 56th Hoogovens tournament, group A, January 1994, Wijk aan Zee, Cat. XIV (2600)
! !! Player !! Rating !! 1 !! 2 !! 3 !! 4 !! 5 !! 6 !! 7 !! 8 !! 9 !! 10 !! Total !! TPR !! Place
|-
|-style="background:#ccffcc;"
| 1 || align=left| || 2625 ||  || 0 || ½ || 1 || ½ || 1 || 1 || 1 || 1 || 1 || 7 || 2817 || 1
|-
| 2 || align="left" | || 2630 || 1 ||  || 1 || 0 || ½ || 1 || 0 || ½ || 1 || ½ || 5½ || 2676 || 2
|-
| 3 || align="left" | || 2545 || ½ || 0 ||  || ½ || ½ || ½ || ½ || 1 || 1 || ½ || 5 || 2649 || 3–5
|-
| 4 || align="left" | || 2605 || 0 || 1 || ½ ||  || 0 || 1 || ½ || ½ || ½ || 1 || 5 || 2642 || 3–5
|-
| 5 || align="left" | || 2580 || ½ || ½ || ½ || 1 ||  || 0 || ½ || 1 || 0 || 1 || 5 || 2645 || 3–5
|-
| 6 || align="left" | || 2570 || 0 || 0 || ½ || 0 || 1 ||  || 1 || ½ || 0 || 1 || 4 || 2560 || 6–7
|-
| 7 || align="left" | || 2615 || 0 || 1 || ½ || ½ || ½ || 0 ||  || ½ || 1 || 0 || 4 || 2555 || 6–7
|-
| 8 || align="left" | || 2605 || 0 || ½ || 0 || ½ || 0 || ½ || ½ ||  || 1 || ½ || 3½ || 2519 || 8–9
|-
| 9 || align="left" | || 2650 || 0 || 0 || 0 || ½ || 1 || 1 || 0 || 0 ||  || 1 || 3½ || 2514 || 8–9
|-
| 10 || align="left" | || 2570 || 0 || ½ || ½ || 0 || 0 || 0 || 1 || ½ || 0 ||  || 2½ || 2425 || 10
|}

References

Tata Steel Chess Tournament
1994 in chess
1994 in Dutch sport